Byford is a suburb on the south-eastern edge of Perth, Western Australia, and has its origins in a township that was gazetted under the name "Beenup" in 1906.  "Beenup", a corruption of the Aboriginal name associated with nearby Beenyup Brook, was the spelling that had been applied to a railway siding there.  The uncorrupted form, "Bienyup" received mention in surveyor Robert Austin's account of an expedition through the area in 1848. In 1920, the name of the township was changed to Byford.

History
Little has been documented of the Aboriginal occupation of the Byford area, but material traces of the district's original inhabitants have been found in numerous locations.  The foothills were on the periphery of Thomas Peel's 1834 land grant, and during the 1840s European settlers took up small land holdings in the area. Names of early settlers included Lazenby, Mead, and Liddelow.  Mead was an enterprising farmer with numerous landholdings in the foothills between the Serpentine River and the Wongong Brook, and at East Rockingham.  The district had an entirely rural population until the early part of the 20th century.

Brickmaking contributed much to the development of Byford.  Shale at Cardup had already come to the attention of colonists by the 1850s, but it was not until around the turn of the 20th century that a commercial brickmaking venture commenced at Cardup.  In 1903, John Millard (a former manager of the Bunning Bros brickworks in East Perth) established The Cardup Steam Pressed Brick Company.  Two years later, he entered into partnership with Atkins and Law, a rising giant in Western Australia's commercial world.  With an injection of capital from Atkins and Law, the brickworks grew to become one of the state's leading producers of pressed shale brick.

A second major brickworks was set up at Beenup, north of Cardup, in 1913.  This industry was a state government initiative aimed at reducing the cost of worker housing.  Like the brickworks operating at Cardup and Armadale, this one exploited the shale deposits of the escarpment to produce high quality pressed brick and used the railway to transport the finished product to customers.  The State Brickworks at Byford closed down in 1964, due in part to its operations being eclipsed by a new brickworks in Armadale.  The Cardup brickworks closed in 2012, but much of the infrastructure is still extant.

Shortly after the brickworks had been established at Beenup, local land owner Mr C C Blythe (of Blythewood Park Estate) initiated the planning of another townsite on the eastern side of the rail line - a convenient distance from the brickworks and highway.  The new townsite, which is now the most established part of Byford, has a distinctive square plan in which are centred two concentric circles, long diagonal roads, and short perpendicular roads. Blythe gave the new settlement a hall.  A new name for the township was chosen by residents in 1919 and gazetted the following year.  Anglican and Presbyterian churches and a state school were among the first community buildings erected in Byford.

The original 1906 township was located south-west of the intersection of Soldiers Road and Mead Street but it appears that little if any housing was built in that area until much later in the 20th century.  However, the 1906 townsite included an allocation of land for recreation which is still used for that purpose today.

Construction of the South Western Railway reached the district in 1892.  Some time later a stop bearing the name Beenup was established in the vicinity of the present day township.  In 1957 a station was established on the line between Abernethy Road and Mead Street. After a long period of disuse, this station was demolished around 1990.  The current Byford station is located just south of this.  It is served by Transwa's twice daily Australind service from Perth to Bunbury.

In the 1920s the estate of a local land-owner, Samuel Bateman, was subdivided into smaller farms for the Group Settlement Scheme.

Employment provided by the State Brickworks, the Cardup Brickworks, and the munition works (i.e. the Royal Australian Navy Armament Depot) that were established between Nettleton Road and the Cardup Brook in 1942 were significant factors contributing to growth of the township of Byford. It was also a service town for a number of mill communities in the hills to the east and south-east, as well as a thriving rural community.

In 1977, the local government responsibilities for Byford were transferred from the Shire of Armadale-Kelmscott (now the City of Armadale) to the Shire of Serpentine-Jarrahdale. Recently, Byford has become an extension of the Perth metropolitan area, connected to the Kwinana Freeway by Thomas Road, and has experienced a substantial rise in population. 

Historically, Byford's rural land supported sheep, beef and dairy cattle, orchards, and a vineyard (Sunrays, owned by the Vlasich family), but in recent decades there has been an increase in hobby farms geared to equine pursuits, and more recently housing estates with generous lot sizes.

The new subdivision "Byford on the Scarp" was constructed on the long-disused Navy Armament Depot. The depot was closed in 1981 and its functions relocated to Garden Island.  After standing empty and neglected for many years, the storage bunkers and other depot buildings were progressively demolished, this work being complete in 2000. Traces of the rail infrastructure that once served the depot and brickworks still are visible today.

Today, Byford is a town with most of the amenities and conveniences that one comes to expect in Australia, including halls, six state schools, clubs, sporting oval, trotting complex, a range of shops and businesses, a flour mill, and farms in the surrounding rural areas.  A Free Reformed Church was opened on the corner of Soldiers Road and Mead Street in 1987, and a private school was later built alongside this church.

Education
The seven primary schools in Byford are:
 Byford Primary School – government, opened 1901
 Marri Grove Primary School – government, opened 1993
 Byford John Calvin School – private, opened 1999
 West Byford Primary School – government, opened 2013
 Salvado Catholic College – Catholic, opened 2016
 Woodland Grove Primary School – government, opened 2017
 Beenyup Primary School – government, opened 2020

The only secondary school in Byford is:
 Byford Secondary College – Government, opened 2014

References

External links
ByfordWA
Heritage Country Choir
Jarrahdale Heritage Society
Byford Bushrangers tee-ball/baseball/softball club

Suburbs of Perth, Western Australia
Shire of Serpentine-Jarrahdale